F. H. Grinlinton was the 11th Surveyor General of Ceylon. He was appointed in 1896, succeeding G. D. Mantell, and held the office until 1904. He was succeeded by Philip David Warren.

References

G